The South Dakota State Jackrabbits are the 19 intercollegiate teams representing South Dakota State University that compete in the U.S. National Collegiate Athletic Association's Division I (for football: Football Championship Subdivision). SDSU is currently a member of the Summit League, the Missouri Valley Football Conference, the Big 12 Conference and Varsity Equestrian. The university won numerous conference championships and several national titles including the NCAA College Division national title in men's basketball in 1963 and the NCAA Division II national title in women's basketball in 2003.

South Dakota State football has become a perennial power, a constant presence in the top ten in the polls and annual national title contender. Winning the MVFC title in 2016 & 2020 and having qualified for 10 consecutive playoffs (11 overall), they’ve been FCS playoffs semifinalists 4 times in that time span and were national runners-up in 2020. 

The 2011–2012 season marked the fifth-consecutive trip to the NCAA Tournament for the Jackrabbit women's basketball team, capping a season in which the Jackrabbits won the regular-season Summit League title and their fifth consecutive Summit League Tournament title. In 2019 the Jackrabbit women’s basketball advanced to their first appearance in the NCAA tournament Sweet Sixteen. They were also the 2022 WNIT tournament champions, defeating Seton Hall 82-50.

The Jackrabbit men’s basketball team qualified for its first NCAA Tournament in the 2012–13 season following a second-place regular season finish in the Summit League and winning the Summit League Tournament title. In 2022 the Men’s basketball team broke the Summit League and school record with 30 wins and also became the first school to run the table in conference play at 18-0. They then qualified for their 6th NCAA tournament, going a full 21-0 against conference foes. They ended their season at 30-5 (18-0).

The Jackrabbit baseball team qualified for the 2013 NCAA Tournament and traveled to Eugene, Oregon, losing the first game to eventual regional champion Oregon and then being eliminated by the University of San Francisco in a 13-inning defensive battle.

In 2018, the school had its first Division I champion wrestler with Seth Gross.

Sports sponsored

Athletic facilities

South Dakota State has some of the best athletic facilities in their region, The Summit League, and the Missouri Valley Football Conference. Some of the university's venues compete as some of the finest in the nation (Sanford Jackrabbit Athlete Complex and the Dana J. Dykhouse Stadium).

 Frost Arena is the 6,500 seat on campus facility that houses men's and women's basketball, and women's volleyball teams. Frost Arena is currently on the master plan to add more modern concessions, restrooms and seating, as well as several building additions which include a wrestling practice facility, and a multi court arena that would double for basketball and volleyball practices as well as a competition venue for wrestling and volleyball. 
 Erv Huether Field is home of the Jackrabbit baseball team. Seats 600 spectators.
 Dana J. Dykhouse Stadium, the on-campus football stadium with a capacity for 19,340 fans, opened for the 2016 season.
 Fishback Soccer park. seats 1500 spectators. Also on the master athletic plans are an on campus soccer stadium and practice fields.
 2025 master plan calls for an aquatics competition and practice facility.
 Dykhouse Student Athlete Center. Located in the north end zone of Dana J. Dykhouse Stadium.  Houses football staff, sports medicine and athletic training.
 Sanford Jackrabbit Athletic Complex, Connected to the north side of the Dykhouse Athlete Center. it boasts 149,284-square feet of practice space and one of five 300-meter tracks in NCAA Division 1. 
 Stanley J. Marshall HPER Center Pool. The six-lane competition pool is 25 yards long. A diving well allows for 1- and 3-meter competitions.

The Dykhouse Student Athlete Center, the home of Jackrabbit football, opened prior to the 2010 football season. The Sanford Jackrabbit Athlete Complex, a state-of-the-art indoor practice and competition facility opened October 11, 2014. It is immediately north of and attached to the Dykhouse Student Athlete Center. The SJAC has bleacher seating for up to 1,000 spectators and can be used for track practice and track meets, football practice, softball and baseball practice, and other events within the SDSU athletic department. It has been recently furbished with a state-of-the-art indoor golf practice area consisting of 4500 square feet of practice space, with slope, sand traps and simulators for rainy weather and the winter months. When completed, the 149,284-square foot facility was the largest indoor practice facility in Division I athletics and features an eight-lane, 300-meter track, one of only five collegiate indoor tracks of that size in the nation. Inside the track is an 80-yard football field plus end zones at each end. The turf in the facility is soy-based Astroturf. The SJAC has areas for sports medicine including rehab space, a training room, additional weight-training facilities, hydrotherapy, a football team room, offices and academic advising facilities. The Dykhouse Student Athlete Center is immediately north of the new stadium for Jackrabbit football, the 19,340-capacity Dana J. Dykhouse Stadium, opened in the Fall of 2016. The Dykhouse Stadium was constructed for easy expansion to 22,500 and the potential for future expansion to a capacity of 40,000. Like the SJAC, the turf in the Stadium is soy-based Astroturf.

In November 2018, SDSU finished construction on a new practice facility connected to Frost Arena that contains 2 full-size practice courts for men's and women's basketball and women's volleyball.

Funds are currently being raised for a wrestling practice facility.

National championships

Team

Notable alumni

Cleveland L. Abbott — American football coach
Colin Cochart — American football player
Rod DeHaven — Olympic marathoner
Doug Eggers — American football player
Steve Heiden — American football player
Jim Langer — American football player
Jon Madsen — wrestler; professional MMA fighter
Paul Miller — American football player
Josh Ranek — Canadian football player
Wayne Rasmussen — American football player
Pete Retzlaff — American football player, executive
Caleb Thielbar — baseball player
Adam Timmerman — American football player
Blake Treinen — baseball player
Adam Vinatieri — American football player
Danny Batten — American football player
Nate Wolters — basketball player
Zach Zenner — American football player
Dallas Goedert — American football player
Dick Beardsley — American marathon runner

References

External links